The 2019 season was Lancashire Thunder's fourth and final season, in which they competed in the final edition of the Women's Cricket Super League, a Twenty20 competition. The side finished bottom of the group stage, losing nine of their ten matches, with the other ending in a tie.

The side was captained by Kate Cross and coached by Mark McInnes. They played two home matches at Aigburth Cricket Ground and one apiece at Old Trafford, Stanley Park and Chester Boughton Hall. Following the season, women's domestic cricket in England was reformed, with the creation of new "regional hubs", with Lancashire Thunder replaced by North West Thunder, which retained some elements of the original team but represent a larger area.

Squad
Lancashire Thunder's 15-player squad is listed below. Age given is at the start of Lancashire Thunder's first match of the season (6 August 2019).

Women's Cricket Super League

Season standings

 Advanced to the Final.
 Advanced to the Semi-final.

League stage

Statistics

Batting

Bowling

Fielding

Wicket-keeping

References

Lancashire Thunder seasons
2019 in English women's cricket